Tarina may refer to:

People with the given name 
 Tarina, a woman that the village of Traina in Qatar was named after
 Tarina Patel, South African actress, film producer, and model
 Tarina Tarantino (born 1969), American jewelry designer

Other 
 Țarina, a village in Roșia Montană Commune, Alba County, Romania
 Țarina mine, a mine in Romania